Shurjeh-ye Emam Jomeh (also Romanized as Shūrjeh-ye Emām Jom‘eh) is a village in Varqeh Rural District, in the Central District of Charuymaq County, East Azerbaijan Province, Iran. At the 2006 census, its population was 132, in 22 families.

References 

Populated places in Charuymaq County